Pennsylvania General Assembly elections, 2008 may refer to:
Pennsylvania House of Representatives election, 2008
Pennsylvania State Senate elections, 2008